Major General Joseph "Joe" Lutz (April 17, 1933 – May 9, 1999) was a two star general in the United States Army. He played an important role in getting increased recognition for Special Operations in the U.S. Military.

Early life 
Joseph Lutz was born April 17, 1933 in Indianapolis Indiana. An All-State Tail Back for Cathedral High School, he accepted a scholarship to St. Norbert College where he earned Catholic League All-American Honors at the same position. His designation as the Distinguished Military Graduate of the Army Reserve Officer Training Corps program at St. Norbert College in 1955 was a sign of things to come. After his required 4 years of service, he was offered tryouts with the Green Bay Packers and Pittsburgh Steelers, but opted to continue his Military Service.

Personal life

Joseph Lutz was the son of Frank Lutz and Marie Bender. He married Joyce Anne Cunningham (4/1/1933 - February 26, 2008) on February 7, 1959 in Indianapolis Indiana. They had five children.

Joseph Lutz died on May 9, 1999 in Clearwater Beach, Florida.

References

External links
 https://www.nytimes.com/1982/10/04/us/man-in-the-news-general-for-a-special-force.html
 https://sncrotc.omeka.net/exhibits/show/rotc/item/27

1933 births
1999 deaths
United States Army generals